Edward Raymond Fitz Gerald (May 21, 1924 – June 14, 2020) was an American professional baseball player and coach. A former catcher, he appeared in 807 games played in Major League Baseball over 12 seasons (–) for the Pittsburgh Pirates, Washington Senators and Cleveland Indians. Fitz Gerald attended Saint Mary's College of California and served in the United States Army in the European Theater of Operations in World War II before beginning his professional career in 1946.

Used primarily in a backup role throughout his career, he exceeded 100 games played as a rookie with the 1948 Pirates (102 games), and again with the 1954 Senators (115). Fitz Gerald ended his career with a .260 batting average, 82 doubles, ten triples, 19 home runs, 217 runs batted in and 542 hits.

While with the Pirates, Fitz Gerald caught Cliff Chambers' no-hitter on May 6, . As a Washington Senator, he also broke up Chicago White Sox pitcher Billy Pierce's bid for a perfect game on June 27,  by doubling with two out in the ninth.

Following his retirement as an active player, Fitz Gerald coached in the American League from – for the Indians, Kansas City Athletics and Minnesota Twins, and briefly managed the Fresno Giants of the Class A California League.

He died on June 14th, 2020.

References

External links

1924 births
2020 deaths
United States Army personnel of World War II
Baseball coaches from California
Baseball players from California
Cleveland Indians coaches
Cleveland Indians players
Indianapolis Indians players
Kansas City Athletics coaches
Major League Baseball catchers
Major League Baseball first base coaches
Military personnel from California
Minnesota Twins coaches
Sportspeople from Santa Barbara County, California
Pittsburgh Pirates players
Sacramento Solons players
Saint Mary's Gaels baseball players
Washington Senators (1901–1960) players
Wenatchee Chiefs players